Artur Yuryevich Maliyevsky (born 21 August 2001) is a Belarusian professional footballer who plays for Neman Grodno.

References

External links 
 
 

2001 births
Living people
Belarusian footballers
Association football goalkeepers
FC Neman Grodno players